Jüri Pertmann (13 July 1938 – 11 July 2019) was an Estonian freedom fighter, psychologist, independence activist, civil servant and public figure. He served as chairman of the Memento Union. He also served as head of the Tartu Countys' Department of the Citizenship and Migration Board.

Education 
In 1953, he graduated from Tartu II Secondary School. From 1953 to 1956, he studied at Tartu Construction Technical School. In the spring of 1959, he graduated from the Russian-language evening high school in the 7th camp in the Mordovian SSR as a political prisoner. As it was not possible to enter a university in Estonia with a high school diploma obtained in Mordovia, he graduated from an Estonian-language evening high school in 1970 in Elva, He was not admitted to the university in 1970 for political reasons. In June 1975, Pertmann graduated from the Faculty of History of the University of Tartu with a degree in psychology and studied management psychology at the same university in 1978–1981. In addition, he graduated from the Ministry of Light Industry of the Estonian SSR basic preparatory courses for the leading staff in the study plant and was awarded the position of production manager.

Career 

 1956–1957 Construction worker in Tartu
 1958–1963 Sawmill worker in various prison camps in Mordovia, blacksmith, tailor and brick factory worker
 1964–1975 EKE system technician, senior technician, civil engineer, designer
 1975–1981 social psychologist and psychologist in the EKE system (1975–1990 Adviser to the Chairman of Tartu KEK on social psychology and information work)
 1982–1990 Leading specialist in sociological research, analysis of the company's activities, personnel reserve and evaluation in the management laboratory of EKE
 1991–1992 Sociologist at the development and training company EKE Ariko (originally EKE Tehnokeskus)
 1993 (14 January) - 1994 (30 April) Senior Reporter with special duties at the Ministry of the Interior
 1994 (May) - 2004 Head of the Tartu County Department of the Citizenship and Migration Board
 2004–2005 Project manager of the charity fund "Hope"
 2005–2019 G4S Estonia (formerly Falck) security guard

Political activity 
Pertmann was one of the signatories of the so-called 20 Tartu Men's Bill "Message to the Estonian Congress - Proposal to Restore the Republic of Estonia", which was published in the newspaper Edasi on February 14, 1990. Over the following 25 years, he ran unsuccessfully for multiple positions:, in 1990, for the Supreme Soviet of the Estonian Soviet Socialist Republic on the list of the Memento Common Platform in Tallinn; in 1992, for the Riigikogu in Põlva, Valga and Võru County lists of the Estonian National Independence Party; in 1999, for the Riigikogu on the list of Moderates in Tartu County; and in 2013, for the Nõo Parish council in the list of NÕO.EU.

Resistance to Soviet occupation

Kuperjanovians 
On 26 March 1954, Pertmann and some friends founded Kuperjanovlased, an underground resistance movement for schoolchildren and friends, in Tartu. Its aim was to free Estonia. The Kuperjanovs included Eino Neerot, Tõnu Raid and Kaarel Tuvike. Among other things, in February 1955, a few days before the 37th anniversary of the Republic of Estonia, the Kuperjanovs distributed almost 1,000 leaflets in Tartu calling for resistance. The KGB failed to identify members of the Kuperjanovs' organization, and the organization was not caught.

Arrest 
Jüri Pertmann was arrested on 11 November 1957, near the border between Finland and the Soviet Union near Gvardeiskaja railway station, while fleeing to Finland for refuge.

Imprisonment 

He was jailed in Vyborg and Leningrad prisons for a short time and in Patarei prison in Tallinn. By a decision of 28 January 1958, the Supreme Court of the Estonian SSR convicted him of attempting to cross the state border illegally and of anti-Soviet propaganda  "Year of the Suffering of the Estonian People." Pertmann's activities in the Kuperjanovs remained unknown to the security services. In the spring, In 1958, Pertmann was transferred to Sosnovka Labor Camp No. 7 in Mordovia, where he stayed in various prison camps, participating in the activities of the Estonian Youth Malev and the Estonian Union of New Ethnic Underworld organizations, among others. From then on, Pertmann was under KGB surveillance until 1988, but continued to communicate with Estonian nationalists and dissidents. Jaan Isotamm was a close friend. He participated in the distribution of samizdat (underground self-published tracts). In 1968, 1973, 1978, 1983 and 1988, on the anniversaries of his release from the prison camp, he organized gatherings in the Meeri country house, fomenting anti-Soviet and anti-occupation sentiment.

At the end of the 1970s, on the initiative of Lithuanian dissident Viktoras Petkus, an attempt was made to create an organization uniting the Estonian-Latvian-Lithuanian resistance movements. Among others, Pertmann participated on behalf of Estonia. However, the discussions failed and no organization was formed.

During the events of 2006, Pertmann wrote a public letter in support of Solidarity, a Polish independent trade union.

Writing 
Between 1979 and 1984, Pertmann compiled and published an underground almanac, Sotsioloogilised Vihikud (Sociological Booklets), in which he sought to open up and explain historical ideas in Estonia, the Soviet Union, and elsewhere in the world in political, social, and economic terms. However, the almanac reproduced as photocopies reached only a few readers.

Recognition 

 8 October 2010: Lieutenant Kuperjanov's Merit (recognition of the Julius Kuperjanov Society) 
 21 February 2018: Order of the National Coat of Arms, 5th Class (by the decision of the President of the Republic of 5 February 2018)

References 

1938 births
2019 deaths
Estonian independence activists
Estonian anti-communists
Soviet dissidents
Gulag detainees
Estonian psychologists
Estonian civil servants
Recipients of the Order of the National Coat of Arms, 5th Class
University of Tartu alumni
People from Tartu